Sarrok (also Romanized as Sarrok and Sar Rok; also known as Sarrūk and Sarūk) is a village in Mashayekh Rural District, Naghan District, Kiar County, Chaharmahal and Bakhtiari Province, Iran. At the 2016 census, its population was 380, in 74 families.

References 

Populated places in Kiar County